Artur Davtyan (born August 8, 1992) is an Armenian gymnast. He is a member of the Armenia national team in gymnastics. Davtyan is a bronze medalist in the men's vault event at the 2020 Summer Olympics, World Championship Gold Medalist in men's vault, European Youth Champion, silver medalist in the World Cup and an Olympian.

Early life
Arthur Davtyan was born on August 8, 1992, in Yerevan, Armenia. In 1998, at the age of 7, he began to do gymnastics. Since 2008, he is a member of the Armenian national gymnastics team.

Career

Youth
In 2009, at the Youth Olympic Festival in Tampere, Finland, Davtyan, along with fellow Armenians Vahan Vardanyan and Arthur Tovmasyan, took 6th place in the team event among 23 teams. In the individual competition, Davtyan took the same place in 6th place in the all-around, 7th place in the vault, 6th place on the parallel bars and 9th place in the exercises on the rings. A year later, at the Junior European Championships in Birmingham, with a score of 15,462, Davtyan became champion in the vault. In addition, he came in 4th place in the exercises on the rings with a result of 13,975, ninth place on the uneven bars and seventh in the exercises on the pommel horse.

Adult
Davtyan debuted on adult competition in 2011, at the individual 2011 European Artistic Gymnastics Championships that were held in Berlin, where he participated in all disciplines. Championship for the Armenian sportsman emerged successful. Being the youngest member of the all-around, Davtyan took 20th place. In other disciplines, Davtyan could not overcome the qualifying threshold. Of all the exercises, his best result was 14th place in the vault.

In January 2012, Davtyan took part in an international qualifying tournament, held in London. In the vault, showing the best result of the disciplines in which he participated, Davtyan gaining 15.450 points and won second place. In the all-around, with 84.2 points, he finished 12th. According to the results of the tournament, the Armenian athlete received a ticket to the Olympic Games in 2012.

In March 2012, the third phase of the Artistic Gymnastics World Cup in Doha, Davtyan, with the result of 15,725, was second in the vault, with a score of 14,575, and the fourth in the exercises on the pommel horse. Davtyan was awarded the Aspire Academy Award for best young gymnasts of the Doha World Cup. He shared the award with Diana Bulimar.

In the same year, the Armenian athletes once again took part in the 2012 European Men's Artistic Gymnastics Championships, held in Montpellier, where in the all-around, he finished fifth. At the 2012 Summer Olympics in London, he was unsuccessful. Davtyan injured his leg and could not overcome the qualifying stage.

Davtyan won bronze on Vault at the 2013 European Championships, silver on Vault in 2016, and in gold on Pommel Horse in 2021. He also earned bronze on Vault at the 2019 Doha World Cup, gold on Vault at the 2019 European Games in Minsk, and, in 2017, silver on Vault and bronze on Pommel Horse at the 2017 Doha World Cup. In 2015, he earned three medals at the 2015 Doha World Challenge Cup: gold on Vault, silver on Rings, and bronze on Pommel Horse.

Davtyan earned the bronze medal in the vault at the 2020 Summer Olympics in Tokyo, both his first individual Olympic medal and the first Olympic medal for Armenia in artistic gymnastics. Davtyan's medal was also the first for Armenia at the 2020 Olympics.

At the 2021 Cairo World Cup in Cairo, Davtyan performed a new pommel horse element, which was officially named the Davtyan after him.

References

External links
 
 

1992 births
Living people
Sportspeople from Yerevan
Armenian male artistic gymnasts
Olympic gymnasts of Armenia
Gymnasts at the 2012 Summer Olympics
Gymnasts at the 2016 Summer Olympics
Gymnasts at the 2019 European Games
European Games medalists in gymnastics
European Games gold medalists for Armenia
European champions in gymnastics
Gymnasts at the 2020 Summer Olympics
Medalists at the 2020 Summer Olympics
Olympic medalists in gymnastics
Olympic bronze medalists for Armenia
World champion gymnasts